Gradaterebra  is a genus of sea snails, marine gastropod mollusks in the family Terebridae, the auger snails.

Species
 Gradaterebra assecla (Iredale, 1924)
 Gradaterebra capensis (E. A. Smith, 1873)
 Gradaterebra easmithi (Aubry, 1999)
 Gradaterebra kowiensis (W. H. Turton, 1932)
 Gradaterebra lightfooti (E. A. Smith, 1899)
 Gradaterebra ninfae (G. B. Campbell, 1961)
 Gradaterebra pilsbryi (Aubry, 1999)
 Gradaterebra planecosta (Barnard, 1958)
 Gradaterebra scalariformis Cotton & Godfrey, 1932
 Gradaterebra severa (Melvill, 1897)
 Gradaterebra sorrentensis (Aubry, 1999)
 Gradaterebra taylori (Reeve, 1860)

References

 Terryn, Y. (2007). Terebridae: A Collectors Guide. Conchbooks & Natural Art. 59pp + plates.

External links
 

Terebridae
Gastropod genera